Garcinia travancorica is a species of flowering plant in the family Clusiaceae. It is found only in India. It is threatened by habitat loss.

References

travancorica
Endemic flora of India (region)
Taxonomy articles created by Polbot

Critically endangered flora of Asia